Marsel Çaka (born 31 March 1995) is an Albanian footballer who currently plays as a goalkeeper for Dinamo in the Albanian First Division.

Club career
Çaka is a product of the KF Tirana academy which he joined as a child, before being promoted to the senior team in January 2013 where he featured in 5 league games in the 2012–13 season. He became the club's first choice goalkeeper for the first half of the 2013–14 season at the age of just 18. The return of veteran goalkeeper Ilion Lika meant that Çaka became the second choice goalkeeper.

On 9 September, Çaka signed a long time contract with the club and was immediately loaned to Albanian First Division side Kamza for the rest of the season.

International career

Under-19
Çaka was part of the Albania U19 team selected for the 2013 Mediterranean Games in Mersin, Turkey. He featured in the last game of the tournament against Italy, coming on as a 44th-minute substitute for Aldo Teqja in the 3–1 loss for the seventh place, meaning Albania finished in last place in the tournament.

He made his international debut for Albania U19 in a 5-1 friendly win over Montenegro.

Under-21
He received his first call up to the Albania under-21 national team in November 2013 for a European Under-21 Championship qualifier against Hungary on 14 November. He was an unused substitute in the 2–0 away win, as he was an understudy to first choice goalkeeper Aldo Teqja. He was called up to a friendly tournament held in Dubai in December 2014 where he made his debut, coming off the bench in the final game of the three game tournament against United Arab Emirates U23.

References

External links

1995 births
Living people
Footballers from Tirana
Albanian footballers
Association football goalkeepers
KF Tirana players
FC Kamza players
FK Dinamo Tirana players
Kategoria Superiore players
Kategoria e Parë players